"Yo Perreo Sola" (English: "I Twerk Alone") is a song by Puerto Rican rapper Bad Bunny from his second studio album YHLQMDLG (2020), featuring uncredited vocals by Nesi. The song's music video features Bad Bunny performing in drag.  It won a Latin Grammy Award for Best Reggaeton Performance. A remix featuring Nesi and Ivy Queen was released on October 14, 2020, following their performance of the song at the 2020 Billboard Music Awards.

Production
Musically, "Yo Perreo Sola" comprises 808 drums and "stripped-down" reggaeton beats. It features vocals from Puerto Rican Latin trap artist Nesi (Genesis Rios). According to Rolling Stone, the song "is dedicated to those who desire to dance alone, and safely, at the club." Bad Bunny told the magazine in an interview:

Critical reception
Writing for Jezebel, Shannon Malero called the original "song of the summer", adding that the remix "elevates this song from good to pendeja power anthem of the winter." Liz Calvario for Entertainment Weekly, labeled the performance at the Billboard Music Awards as "epic" and "slamming". For E!, Billy Nilles called the remix "excellent", adding that the "extra feminine energy on the track made it more powerful". Billboard magazine named Ivy Queen joining the remix as one of five uplifting moments in Latin music for the week of October 17, 2020. Billboard also named it Latin remix of the week. Before the remixed version, album reviews by Pitchfork and NPR criticized that Nesi was not credited as a performer on the track listing, despite the song's message of empowerment.

Time named "Yo Perreo Sola" remix the third best song of the year. Complex ranked the original version the seventh-best of the year, calling it "one of 2020's defining musical moments," and Billboard ranked it 18th. Pitchfork included it among the 100 best songs of the year and on "the 22 best songs by Latinx artists in 2020." In 2022, Rolling Stone listed the remix at number 14 on its list of the 100 Greatest Reggaeton Songs of All Time.

Music video

Directed by Bad Bunny and Stillz, the music video for "Yo Perreo Sola" premiered on March 27, 2020. Bad Bunny opens the clip in a red vinyl miniskirt and thigh-high boots, as he pushes away a group of men who approaches him. He also appears perreando in a green room, with the message "Ni una menos" displayed in the background. The video closes with "Si no quiere bailar contigo, respeta, ella perrea sola" ("If she doesn’t want to dance with you, respect her, she perrea alone.")

Stillz stated in Billboard that the performer "wanted to symbolize that men also care about women’s rights and that violence against women also affects us as men... he wanted to impact and take a message to the reggaeton community that usually is not as open to speak about the LGBTQ community." Stillz and stylist Chloe Delgadillo further explained the looks displayed in the video, with the red outfit representing a sexy "badass" girl in latex suit, the second look, a perfect "Instagram girl" who "is ready to dance alone at the club", and the third, a "classy girl", dressed in a black outfit with a shiny hat.

Writing for Billboard, Suzette Fernandez opined, "it's as visually eye-opening as it is conscientious, talking about respect for women and highlighting the LGBT community, a departure for Latin urban music." In Rolling Stone, Suzy Exposito described the video as "jaw dropping", and considered the message in the closing scene "[a] damning-but-necessary public service announcement on sexual harassment." As of September 2021, the music video has received more than 500 million views on YouTube.

Vulture and Billboard ranked it as the best and fifth-best music video of 2020, respectively.

Charts

Weekly charts

Year-end charts

Certifications

See also
List of Billboard number-one Latin songs of 2020

References

2020 singles
2020 songs
Bad Bunny songs
Ivy Queen songs
Spanish-language songs
Songs written by Bad Bunny
Songs about dancing
Songs with feminist themes
Latin Grammy Award for Best Reggaeton Performance